Emmi Jurkka ( originally Bergström, later Tuomi; 21 April 1899 — 17 October 1990) was a Finnish actor and theatre manager, with a career in stage, film and TV spanning over 60 years.

Career
Emmi Jurkka has been described as "legendary" in the world of Finnish theatre. As an actor, she was physical, sensual, expressive and immersive. She performed a wide range of roles, from tragic to comic, and serious to lighthearted.

Stage
During her career, Jurkka was attached to several Finnish theatres, including Turku City Theatre, Tampere Theatre Helsinki City Theatre and the Finnish National Theatre.

In 1953, Emmi Jurkka, together with her daughter Vappu, founded a small studio theatre, which continues to operate to this day.

Film
Jurkka appeared in over 40 films, mainly in the 1940s and 50s. Among her more notable roles was as Hilda Husso in the 1954 , for which she received the Best Supporting Actress Jussi Award.

She is also credited with directing five short films.

Honours and awards

Personal life

References

Further reading
Pakkanen, O.: Rakas Emmi (Helsinki: Otava, 1984)  (biography; in Finnish)

External links

20th-century Finnish actresses
Finnish film actresses
Finnish theatre people
Pro Finlandia Medals of the Order of the Lion of Finland
Actors from Helsinki
1899 births
1990 deaths